"Homer vs. Dignity" is the fifth episode of the twelfth season of the American animated television series The Simpsons. It first aired on the Fox network in the United States on November 26, 2000. In the episode, Mr. Burns hires a cash-strapped Homer as his "prank monkey", paying him to play pranks on others and humiliate himself in public.

The episode was written by Rob LaZebnik in his last writing credit for over eight years, until season 20's "Father Knows Worst". The episode features cultural references to The Magic Christian and The Birds. The episode has been met with negative reviews and is often regarded by fans and critics as one of the worst episodes of the entire series.

Plot
The Simpsons go out to dinner to celebrate Bart getting his first test "A" grade; however, Homer's credit card is rejected and, after a failed escape attempt, the family are made to sing for customers to work off their bill. After Homer reveals that he sold the back seats of his car for gasoline money (which he spent on a novelty car horn), he and Marge seek advice from financial planner Lindsay Naegle, who informs them that, due to poor money management by Homer, the family have multiple mortgages and will need to declare bankruptcy several times.

Meanwhile, Mr. Burns is looking to amuse himself while his assistant, Smithers, is in New Mexico performing in a Malibu Stacy musical that he wrote. When Homer asks if he can have a raise, Burns offers him cash in exchange for throwing pudding at Lenny. He does so, amusing Burns, who makes Homer his "prank monkey". Burns pays Homer to perform embarrassing and cruel tasks, such as pretending to be a baby who "made a boom boom" at the sports stadium restroom, and eating a mint condition Spiderman #1 in front of Comic Book Guy, eventually having Homer masquerade as the Springfield Zoo's new female panda, Sim-Sim, and is electrocuted by animal handlers before being raped by the zoo's male panda, Ping-Ping.

Lisa discovers what Homer has been doing and convinces him his dignity is more important than money. She suggests donating the money he has earned to needy children, so he spends it on toys at Costington's Department Store. Mr. Costington, impressed by this show of generosity, suggests that Homer play Santa Claus in the Thanksgiving Day parade. During the parade, Burns offers Homer a million dollars to throw buckets of fish guts to the crowd; rebuked, Burns performs the prank himself while Homer thanks Lisa for giving him dignity, whilst the townspeople are attacked by seagulls.

Production

The episode was written by Rob LaZebnik and directed by Neil Affleck, the last episode that he directed. It is LaZebnik's first full written script with the first script being "G-G-Ghost D-D-Dad" from "Treehouse of Horror XI" and draws its plot from the British film The Magic Christian, itself an adaptation of Terry Southern's novel of the same name. There was originally a sub-plot with Smithers' musical. LaZebnik brought some friends and his wife to the table read and during the third act was repeatedly ended and went badly making Larry Doyle laugh hysterically.  There was another prank where Mr. Burns put a lottery ticket into a grave and everybody went digging for the lottery ticket. The episode includes a character named Rusty the Clown, a reference to Rusty Nails, the inspiration for Krusty the Clown.

There was originally going to be a running gag where Lenny keeps getting hit with random objects. There were many endings to the original script. One ending was Homer throwing pig's blood into the crowd and 50 years later showing Homer telling a group of children that this was the reason why Thanksgiving was renamed Bloodsfest. They were also going to be hit by blood and laugh. There was also another ending with gravy, but then changed to fish guts. The full version of the song "Sold Separately" was later released on The Simpsons soundtrack album, The Simpsons: Testify. "Homer vs. Dignity" was included on The Simpsons Christmas 2 DVD along with "Dude, Where's My Ranch?", "Skinner's Sense of Snow", and 'Tis the 15th Season".

Reception
The episode has received negative reviews from critics. Cindy White of IGN said that while the episode is universally panned, mostly due to the scene where Homer is implicitly raped by a panda at the zoo, and the intentional recycling of other Simpsons episode premises (such as the Simpsons having financial trouble, Mr. Burns hiring Homer to be his assistant while Smithers is on vacation, someone dressing up as a baby, Homer dressing up as Santa Claus, and Lisa worrying over someone selling their soul), it has funny throwaway jokes and sight gags to make up for it.

In September 2009, Colin Jacobson of DVD Movie Guide gave the episode a negative review, saying "Bad sign number one: when a series plagiarizes itself. That occurs here when Mr. Burns states 'There’s a new Mexico?', a line that was a lot funnier...back in season five. Bad sign number two: a scene in which Homer gets raped by a panda. A couple of the pranks provide minor amusement, but overall, this is a weak episode." Judge Mac McEntire of DVD Verdict said the episode's best moment was with Homer and the panda. Mike Scully believes that the episode's negative reception was due to critics and audiences being unfamiliar with The Magic Christian.

In January 2012, Johnny Dee of The Guardian wrote that many fans regard the panda rape scene as "a low in the show's history" and suggested the phrase "raped by a panda" should replace "jumped the shark" to imply that a popular series has declined in quality and is beyond recovery.

Cultural references 
The chalkboard gag reads "I was not the Sixth Beatle", a reference to the "Fifth Beatle".
The chalkboard on The Simpsons: Christmas 2 DVD reads "I will not surprise the incontinent". This is the chalkboard gag from the season 12 episode, "Insane Clown Poppy".
The episode's plot is similar to the film The Magic Christian:
The main character, Sir Guy Grand, is an eccentric billionaire who bribes people to carry out his whims, similar to Mr. Burns' hiring Homer to be his "prank monkey".
Grand also plays his pranks to shock people, mocking what they consider to be important, similar to the prank that Burns and Homer play on Comic Book Guy.
In celebration of Bart's "A" on an astronomy quiz, the waitstaff at The Singing Sirloin sing "Happy First A", a parody of "Happy Birthday".
When the Simpsons are pressed into service as a Mariachi band to pay for their meal at The Singing Sirloin, they are heard playing:
"La Bamba": Best known for its covers by Ritchie Valens in 1958 and Los Lobos in 1987.
"Spanish Eyes": Originally an instrumental titled "Moon Over Naples", it was re-titled to "Spanish Eyes" when lyrics were added.
Singing Sirloin employee Mary Kay seems to be a reference to the Mary Kay company, judging by her pink makeup and all-pink outfit.
When Smithers asks Mr. Burns for time off to produce his Malibu Stacy musical, Burns laughs and sarcastically asks, "Why not write a musical about the common cat? Or the King of Siam?", referencing the musicals Cats and The King and I, respectively.
Just before Homer and Mr. Burns prank him, Comic Book Guy is eating pink marshmallow Peeps.
Star Trek: Voyager: When Homer says he'd like to buy a mint condition Spider-Man #1 comic, Comic Book Guy sarcastically replies that he'd like an hour on the holodeck with Seven of Nine.
During the Panda-Monium!, Mr. Burns has Homer (costumed as female panda) dance the Lindy Hop, a dance which was very popular during the late 1930s and early 1940s.
One of the Thanksgiving parade balloons is of Rusty the Clown, a reference to Rusty Nails:
Rusty Nails was a popular TV clown in the 1960s in Portland, Oregon, where Simpsons creator Matt Groening grew up.
Krusty the Clown is loosely based on Rusty Nails.
Other balloons seen in the parade include:
A balloon that closely resembles El Chapulín Colorado, the main character of the TV series of the same name, on whom Bumblebee Man is based.
Funky Winkerbean, the title character from the comic strip.
The Noid, who was an advertising mascot for Domino's Pizza in the 1980s.
The figure on the parade float "saluting the Native Americans" bears a strong resemblance to Chief Wahoo, the Cleveland Indians' logo.
When the gulls attack the townspeople (who are covered in the fish guts Burns has thrown on them), it is similar to a scene from Alfred Hitchcock's The Birds.

References

External links

 
 
 

The Simpsons (season 12) episodes
2000 American television episodes
Black comedy
Television episodes about rape
Thanksgiving television episodes